BC Budivelnyk Kyiv (in Ukrainian: Будівельник Київ) is a Ukrainian professional basketball club based in Kyiv. The club plays in the Ukrainian Basketball SuperLeague. In June 2018, it was forced to withdraw from the Superleague due to open debts. Two years later, the club returned its activities. The club holds a record ten Ukrainian championships and three Ukrainian Cups, as well as a Soviet championship (1989).

Budivelnyk is owned and operated by the banking and investing company PrivatBank.

History
Founded in the club's current form in 1962, the club was one of the leading clubs in Soviet League basketball. It was formed out of another team from Kyiv, SKIF, that was originally established in 1945. The team was established as a team of the Republican Trade Union Volunteer Sport Society Avanhard, under sponsorship of the local municipal building company Kyivmiskbud-4 (Kyiv-City-Construction-4). In Soviet times, the team played at the 7,000 seat Kyiv Sports Palace. The team won the Soviet League in 1989, and the Ukrainian League six times.

Following the team's long period of success, a period of time in which the team declined ensued, and it was relegated to the lower Ukrainian division, due to financial problems. However, in 2006, the team was rescued by a group of businessmen who invested considerable resources into it, thus allowing it to return to the top league of Ukrainian basketball. Within two years, the team once again became one of the strongest teams in the Ukraine, finishing second in the Ukrainian National League.

In March 2010, the management of Budivelnyk held a joint press conference with the CEO and President of Euroleague Basketball Company, Jordi Bertomeu, announcing that they might join the EuroLeague in the next few years. Eventually, a wildcard was conceded to the team for the 2013–14 EuroLeague season.

On 21 June 2018, the FBU announced Budivelnyk was not allowed to participate in the Ukrainian Superleague due to debts with their players.

In the 2020 offseason, the Budivelnyk club restarted its activities and signed up for the 2020–21 SuperLeague season. Its transfer ban by the FIBA, which was enforced in 2018, was lifted.

Name
The original team played under the name of SKIF, from 1945 to 1962. The current team plays under the current name since 1962. The team's name means "Builder" in Ukrainian. The team is nicknamed as, "Konstruktor" (Constructor) and "Stroitel" (Russian for "Builder").

Arena

BC Budivelnyk played their home games at Kyiv Sport Palace. It was built in 1960 and it has capacity of 7,000 seats.

Current players

Current roster

Honors
 Soviet Union League (1):
  Gold – 1989
  Silver - 1965, 1966, 1977, 1979, 1981, 1982
  Bronze – 1962, 1964, 1970, 1974, 1983, 1984, 1990
 Soviet Union Cup (0):
  Runner Up - 1969, 1972
 Ukrainian SuperLeague (10):
 Gold - 1992 - 1997, 2011, 2013, 2014, 2017
 Silver - 1998, 2010
 Bronze - 1999
 Ukrainian Cup (3):
 Winner – 2012, 2014, 2015

Season by season

Notable players

Notable players

   Volodymyr Tkachenko
   Oleksandr Bilostinny
   Sasha Volkov 
   Anatoliy Polyvoda
   Serhiy Kovalenko
   Vitaly Potapenko
   Anatolij Kovtun
  Luis Flores
  Andrew Betts
  Tomas Delininkaitis
  Dainius Šalenga
  Darjuš Lavrinovič
  Suad Šehović
  Anthony Barber
  Maceo Baston
  Malcolm Delaney
  Khalid El-Amin
  Archie Goodwin
  Brice Johnson
  Leo Lyons
  Jack McClinton
  Derrick Zimmerman
    Steve Burtt Jr.

References

External links
  
 Eurobasket.com BC Budivelnyk Page

Basketball teams in Ukraine
Sport in Kyiv
Basketball teams in the Soviet Union
Privat Group
Avanhard (sports society)
Basketball teams established in 1945
1945 establishments in Ukraine